Best Ballads  is a 1995 compilation album by Toto. It features many of the band's well known ballads.

Track listing 
 "A Secret Love" – (Bobby Kimball, David Paich, Steve Porcaro) – 4:20
 "I'll Be Over You" – (Steve Lukather, Randy Goodrum) – 4:22
 "Africa" – (David Paich, Jeff Porcaro) – 	4:54
 "99" – (David Paich) – 5:13 
 "Mama" – (David Paich, Bobby Kimball) – 5:13 
 "Somewhere Tonight" – (Steve Lukather, David Paich, Jeff Porcaro) – 	3:42
 "Takin' It Back" – (Steve Porcaro) – 3:45
 "I Won't Hold You Back" – (Steve Lukather) – 4:56
 "Anna" – (Steve Lukather, Randy Goodrum) – 4:54
 "Georgy Porgy" – (David Paich) – 4:09
 "Lea" – (Steve Porcaro) – 4:30
 "It's a Feeling" – (Steve Porcaro) – 3:04
 "Rosanna" – (David Paich) – 5:30
 "Angela" – (David Paich) – 4:43
 "Only You" – (Toto) – 4:22
 "Out of Love" – (Jean-Michel Byron, Steve Lukather) – 5:54
 "2 Hearts" – (Steve Lukather) – 5:02

External links 
 
 

Toto (band) albums
1995 compilation albums